The Central District of Shahrekord County is in Chaharmahal and Bakhtiari province, Iran. At the 2006 census, its population was 224,380 in 56,777 households. The following census in 2011 counted 242,215 people in 67,321 households. At the latest census in 2016, the district had 246,046 inhabitants living in 72,511 households.

References 

Shahrekord County

Districts of Chaharmahal and Bakhtiari Province

Populated places in Chaharmahal and Bakhtiari Province

Populated places in Shahr-e Kord County